Partille IF is a Swedish football club located in Partille in Västra Götaland County.

Background
Partille Idrottsförening is a sports club which was founded in 1924. The club currently has sections for football and handball.

Since their foundation Partille IF has participated mainly in the middle and lower divisions of the Swedish football league system.  The club currently plays in Division 4 Göteborg A which is the sixth tier of Swedish football. They play their home matches at the Lexby IP in Partille.

Partille IF are affiliated to Göteborgs Fotbollförbund.

Recent history
In recent seasons Partille IF have competed in the following divisions:

2011 – Division III, Mellersta Götaland
2010 – Division IV, Göteborg A
2009 – Division IV, Göteborg A
2008 – Division IV, Göteborg A
2007 – Division IV, Göteborg A
2006 – Division IV, Göteborg A
2005 – Division V, Göteborg A
2004 – Division VI, Göteborg A
2003 – Division VI, Göteborg A
2002 – Division VI, Göteborg A
2001 – Division VI, Göteborg A
2000 – Division VI, Göteborg A
1999 – Division VI, Göteborg A

Attendances

In recent seasons Partille IF have had the following average attendances:

Footnotes

External links
 Partille IF – Official website
 Partille IF on Facebook

Sports clubs in Gothenburg
Football clubs in Västra Götaland County
Association football clubs established in 1924
1924 establishments in Sweden